Myopordon is a genus of flowering plants in the tribe Cardueae within the family Asteraceae.

 Species
 Myopordon aucheri Boiss. - Iran
 Myopordon damavandica Mozaff.  - Iran
 Myopordon hyrcanum (Bornm.) Wagenitz  - Iran
 Myopordon persicum Boiss.  - Iran
 Myopordon pulchellum (C.Winkl. & Barbey) Wagenitz - Lebanon
 Myopordon thiebautii (Genty) Wagenitz - Lebanon, Syria, Turkey

References

Cynareae
Asteraceae genera
Taxa named by Pierre Edmond Boissier